The Reluctant Debutante is a 1955 play by the British playwright William Douglas Home.

It was first performed (for a 'try-out' week) at the Theatre Royal Brighton after William Douglas-Home spotted the untrained 17-year-old actress Anna Massey and brought her in to audition for the title role. After she wowed the Brighton audiences the play quickly transferred to the Cambridge Theatre, London on 24 May 1955, where it enjoyed a long run  with Wilfrid Hyde-White continuing to play the father and Celia Johnson the neurotic mother, Sheila Broadbent. The production was directed by Jack Minster.

On 30 June 1955 MGM bought the film and stage rights to this hit London success  with the aim of taking it to Broadway.

In 1956 the play premièred on Broadway at the Henry Miller's Theatre with a mostly changed cast but still with Anna Massey in the lead and Wilfrid Hyde-White playing her father.

Plot 
The plot follows an aristocratic family through one of London's debutante seasons. It is a light-hearted, almost farcical comedy which revolves around the mother's deep anxiety and attempts to avoid scandal after she confuses two men (both called David) and accidentally sets up her daughter with 'David Hoylake-Johnston' (who has a reputation as a philanderer) instead of 'David Bulloch' (whom she believes to be the perfect match for her daughter).

The debutante season was designed for aristocratic parents to find well-connected potential suitors for their daughters by throwing (often very expensive) parties and inviting eligible bachelors. 'Sheila Broadbent', the mother of Jane (the eponymous 'Reluctant Debutante'), is terrified that her daughter will lose the chance to meet a good husband if there is a scandal - i.e. 'David Hoylake-Johnston' charming her into having sex, something he is rumoured to have done with other girls. But the rumours are only rumours so she cannot be rude to him, especially after she accidentally invites him to be Jane's date for the night.

Cast

References

External links
 

English plays
1955 plays
Scottish plays
Plays by William Douglas-Home